Klára Soós (born 5 August 1933) is a Hungarian sprinter. She competed in the women's 200 metres at the 1952 Summer Olympics.

References

1933 births
Living people
Athletes (track and field) at the 1952 Summer Olympics
Hungarian female sprinters
Hungarian female hurdlers
Olympic athletes of Hungary
Place of birth missing (living people)